Enteromius stigmasemion is a species of ray-finned fish in the genus Enteromius.

Footnotes 
 

Endemic fauna of the Central African Republic
Enteromius
Taxa named by Henry Weed Fowler
Fish described in 1936